The 2001 NCAA Division I women's basketball tournament began on March 16 and ended on April 1. The tournament featured 64 teams. The Final Four, held at the Savvis Center (now Scottrade Center) in St. Louis, consisted of Connecticut, Notre Dame, Purdue, and Southwest Missouri State (now Missouri State), with Notre Dame defeating Purdue 68–66 to win its first NCAA title.    Notre Dame's Ruth Riley was named the Most Outstanding Player of the tournament.

Notable events
With the Final Four held in the state of Missouri for the first time in NCAA history, 10th seeded University of Missouri rose to the occasion and upset 7th seeded Wisconsin in the first round. They then went on to play the 2nd seeded team from Georgia and won that game as well, advancing to the regional, where their bid to play in their home state ended in a loss to Louisiana Tech. Missouri State also did well. They were seeded 5th, so expected to win their first-round game, but they went on to upset 4th seed Rutgers to set up a game against the Regional's top seed, Duke. Missouri State upset Duke 81–71 to head to the regional final against Washington, who had upset both Florida and Oklahoma. The upsets came to an end as 5th seeded Missouri State beat 6th seeded Washington 104–87 to advance to the Final Four, and a chance to play in front of home state fans.

In the Mideast Regional, the top four seeds all advanced to the regional semifinal, then both higher seeds were upset. 4th seed Xavier knocked off the number one seed in the regional, Tennessee, by a score of 80–65. Third seeded Purdue played second seeded Texas Tech in a game that came down to the wire. Purdue won 74–72, then went on to defeat Xavier for the spot in the Final Four against Missouri State. The upset run by Missouri State came to an end in the semifinal, as Purdue beat them 81–64. The career of Jackie Stiles, who had scored 1,064 points during the season, the only player in NCAA Division I women's basketball history to score 1000 points in a season, came to an end.

In the Midwest and East regionals, both number one seeds advanced to the Final Four. Both Notre Dame and Connecticut were from the Big East and met in the other semifinal. The two teams had met twice before in the season, with Notre Dame winning at their home and UConn beating Notre Dame in the Big East Championship. Early in the game, the prior year National Champion Connecticut looked to be on their way to another championship game. The Huskies led at one point by 16 points in the first half. In the second half, Notre Dame came back, and with just over twelve minutes left, took their first lead of the game. Connecticut went into a scoring drought, going more than five minutes without a point. Notre Dame went on to win 90–75, to head to their first national championship game.

The championship game featured two teams from Indiana. Notre Dame began the game with a repeat of their performance against Connecticut, falling behind by double digits in the first half. The Irish were the best three-point shooting team in the country, but ended up hitting just one of ten attempts. Purdue's Katie Douglas scored 18 points for Purdue, with her final points being a three-pointer to put the Boilermakers in front 66–64 with a little over one minute left in the game. Notre Dame's Ruth Riley scored to tie the game, then rebounded a miss by Purdue. She then took a shot, missed, but was fouled with 5.8 seconds left in the game. Riley sank both free throws to give the Irish a two-point lead and their first national championship.

Tournament records
 Three-point field goal percentage – Alicia Ratay, Notre Dame, hit four of five three-point field goal attempts(80%) in the semi-final game against Connecticut, tying a record for three-point field goal percentage in a Final Four game, held by four other players.
 Margin overcome – Notre Dame overcame a 16-point deficit against Connecticut to win the game, setting a record for the largest margin overcome in a Final Four game.
 Three-point field goal percentage – Notre Dame hit eight of eleven three-point field goal attempts, setting the record for best three-point field goal percentage in a Final Four game.
 Blocks – Notre Dame recorded eleven blocks in the championship game against Purdue, tying the record for blocks in a Final Four game.
 Assists – Tasha Pointer, Rutgers, recorded 18 assist in the West region first-round game against Stephen F. Austin, setting the record for most assists in an NCAA tournament game.
 Field goal percentage – Connecticut held Long Island to 10 field goals on 65 attempts(15.4%) in an East region first-round game, setting the record for the best field goal defense in an NCAA tournament game.

Qualifying teams – automatic
Sixty-four teams were selected to participate in the 2001 NCAA Tournament. Thirty-one conferences were eligible for an automatic bid to the 2001 NCAA tournament.

Qualifying teams – at-large
Thirty-three additional teams were selected to complete the sixty-four invitations.

Bids by conference
Thirty-one conferences earned an automatic bid.  In nineteen cases, the automatic bid was the only representative from the conference. Thirty-three additional at-large teams were selected from twelve of the conferences.

First and second rounds

In 2001, the field remained at 64 teams. The teams were seeded, and assigned to four geographic regions, with seeds 1–16 in each region. In Round 1, seeds 1 and 16 faced each other, as well as seeds 2 and 15, seeds 3 and 14, seeds 4 and 13, seeds 5 and 12, seeds 6 and 11, seeds 7 and 10, and seeds 8 and 9. In the first two rounds, the top four seeds were given the opportunity to host the first-round game. In most cases, the higher seed accepted the opportunity. The exception:

 Fourth seeded Iowa was unable  to host so fifth seeded Utah hosted three first and second-round games

The following table lists the region, host school, venue and the sixteen first and second round locations:

Regionals and  Final Four

The Regionals, named for the general  location, were held from March 24 to March 26 at these sites:

 Midwest Regional  Pepsi Center, Denver, Colorado (Host: University of Colorado)
 Mideast Regional   Birmingham–Jefferson Convention Complex, Birmingham, Alabama  (Host: Southeastern Conference)
 East Regional  Mellon Arena,  Pittsburgh, Pennsylvania (Host: Duquesne University)
 West Regional  Spokane Veterans Memorial Arena, Spokane, Washington (Host: Washington State University)

Each regional winner advanced to the  Final Four held  March 30 and April  1  in St. Louis, Missouri at  the Savvis Center (Host: Missouri Valley Conference)

Bids by state

The sixty-four teams came from thirty-two states, plus Washington, D.C.  Texas had the most teams with five bids. Eighteen states did not have any teams receiving bids.

Brackets
Data source

Mideast regional – Birmingham, AL

West regional – Spokane, Washington

Midwest regional – Denver, Colorado

East regional – Pittsburgh, Pennsylvania

Final Four – St. Louis, Missouri

Record by  conference

Fourteen conferences had more than one bid, or at least one win in NCAA Tournament play:

Seventeen conferences  went 0-1: America East, Big Sky Conference,  Big South Conference, Big West Conference, Colonial, Horizon League, Ivy League, MAC, Mid-Continent, MEAC, Northeast Conference, Ohio Valley Conference,  Patriot League, Southern Conference, Southland, SWAC,  and Trans America

All-Tournament team

 Ruth Riley, Notre Dame
 Niele Ivey, Notre Dame
 Katie Douglas, Purdue
 Shalicia Hurns, Purdue
 Shereka Wright, Purdue

Game officials

 Dennis DeMayo   (semifinal)
 Wesley Dean (semifinal)
 Nan Sisk (semifinal)
 June Courteau (semifinal)
 Greg Small (semifinal)
 Melissa Barlow (semifinal)
 Sally Bell (final)
 Scott Yarbrough (final)
 Lisa Mattingly (final)

See also
 2001 NCAA Division II women's basketball tournament
 2001 NCAA Division III women's basketball tournament
 2001 NAIA Division I women's basketball tournament
 2001 NAIA Division II women's basketball tournament
 2001 NCAA Division I men's basketball tournament

Notes 

NCAA Division I women's basketball tournament
Basketball in Lubbock, Texas
 
NCAA Division I women's basketball tournament
NCAA Division I women's basketball tournament
Events in Lubbock, Texas
Sports competitions in Texas